is a Japanese cyberpunk visual novel by Nitroplus. It's Nitroplus' third game, and the script is written by Gen Urobuchi.

The game was remade in 2011 with enhanced graphics, a new theme song, and character voices added.

The 2011 version is also rated for ages 15 and up instead of the original game's 18+ rating.

Plot
Kikokugai takes place in Shanghai, in a dystopian future of organized crime and cyborg assassins.

References

External links
Kikokugai: The Cyber Slayer's official website 

2002 video games
Video games set in Shanghai
Cyberpunk video games
Japan-exclusive video games
Nitroplus
Video games developed in Japan
Visual novels
Windows games
Windows-only games
Dystopian video games